The Tireu is a right tributary of the river Gurghiu in Romania. It flows into the Gurghiu in the village Tireu.

References

Rivers of Romania
Rivers of Mureș County